David Evans (born 24 October 1974, in Pontypool, Wales) is a squash player from Wales. He won the British Open in 2000, beating Paul Price of Australia in the final 15-11, 15-6, 15-10. He reached a career-high world ranking of World No. 3 in February 2001.

Evans is 6 ft 3, bringing a height and reach advantage to his game. He only took up the sport seriously at 16 years of age.

References

External links 

1974 births
Living people
Welsh male squash players
Sportspeople from Pontypool